is a retired Japanese judoka.

Moriwaki is from Kake, Hiroshima and began judo at the junior high school days.

In 1974, When Moriwaki was a student of Kokushikan University, he won a gold medal at the World University Championships held in Brussels. He took office as the coach of Kokushikan University after graduation from there.

In 1979, Moriwaki won a bronze medal of World Championships held in Paris. He was also expected to get medal of Olympic Games in 1980 but he couldn't because the 1980 Summer Olympic Games was boycotted by the Japanese Government.

Moriwaki won a gold medal at the World Championships in 1981 at the age of 29.

, he coaches at Kokushikan Women's Judo Club.

Achievements 
1970 - Inter-highschool championships (light weight) 1st
1974 - World University Championships (light weight) 1st
1975 - All-Japan Selected Championships (light weight) 3rd
1976 - All-Japan Selected Championships (light weight) 3rd
 - Kodokan Cup (-60 kg) 1st
1977 - All-Japan Selected Championships (-60 kg) 1st
1978 - Jigoro Kano Cup (-60 kg) 2nd
 - All-Japan Selected Championships (-60 kg) 3rd
 - Kodokan Cup (-60 kg) 2nd
1979 - World Championships (-60 kg) 3rd
 - All-Japan Selected Championships (-60 kg) 2nd
 - Kodokan Cup (-60 kg) 2nd
1980 - All-Japan Selected Championships (-60 kg) 1st
1981 - World Championships (-60 kg) 1st
 - All-Japan Selected Championships (-60 kg) 2nd

References

External links
 

Japanese male judoka
People from Hiroshima Prefecture
1952 births
Living people
20th-century Japanese people
21st-century Japanese people